77th Division  or 75th Infantry Division may refer to:

77th Infantry Division (Wehrmacht), Germany
77th Infantry Division of Khurasan, Iran

77th Division (Imperial Japanese Army)
77th Division (People's Republic of China)
77th Division (Spain)
77th Infantry Division (United Kingdom)
77th Infantry Division (United States)
77th Infantry Division (Russian Empire)

77th Mountain Rifle Division, Soviet Union

See also 
 List of military divisions by number